Stefan Golubović (born 1 August 1996) is a Serbian football forward who plays for Trayal Kruševac.

References

External links
 
 
 

1996 births
Living people
Sportspeople from Čačak
Association football forwards
Serbian footballers
Serbian expatriate footballers
Serbian expatriate sportspeople in Germany
Expatriate footballers in Germany
FK Mladost Lučani players
Serbian SuperLiga players